Ebersberg station is a railway station in the municipality of Ebersberg, located in the Ebersberg district in Upper Bavaria, Germany.

The station is called "Ebersberg (Oberbay) Bf" for regional trains except S-train. The name within the S-train system is "Ebersberg".

References

External links
 

Munich S-Bahn stations
Railway stations in Bavaria
Railway stations in Germany opened in 1899
1899 establishments in Bavaria
Buildings and structures in Ebersberg (district)